Redd is a Turkish rock band established in 1996 by singer Doğan Duru and guitarist Berke Hatipoğlu.

Redd may also refer to:

 Redd (biology), the spawning ground of a salmon
 Redd (EP)
 Redd (given name), a masculine given name
 Redd (surname), an American surname

REDD, as an acronym, may refer to: 

 Reducing emissions from deforestation and forest degradation - a climate change mitigation policy
 United Nations REDD Programme - an initiative of the United Nations
 Reenlistment eligibility data display - a US military personnel management format that includes vocational aptitude scores
 "Report every drunk driver" - an initiative in the 1980s to encourage citizens who witnessed motorists driving under the influence to report it by telephone immediately

See also
 Red (disambiguation)
 Read (disambiguation)